Dinara Safina and Katarina Srebotnik were the defending champions, but Srebotnik chose not to participate. Safina partnered with Ágnes Szávay and won the title, defeating Yan Zi and Zheng Jie in the final 6–1, 6–2.

This was the final edition of the tournament. The following year, the Brisbane International was held, merging the men's and women's tournaments together.

Seeds

Draw

Draw

External links
Draw and Qualifying draw

Doubles